Stellar 7: Draxon's Revenge is a 1993 video game developed and published by Dynamix for the 3DO Interactive Multiplayer.

The game's introduction was read by actor Michael Dorn, who was famous at this time for playing a Klingon crewman Worf on the television series Star Trek: The Next Generation.

Plot
The player is the driver of a "super-tank" called Raven. Raven is armed with powerful weapons and an anti-gravity device that allows it to move fast. The player must defeat the evil hordes of Gir Draxon, overlord of the Arcturan Empire, who aims to enslave Earth and its inhabitants.

Reception

GamePro reviewed the game stating "If you want to space out with your 3DO Multiplayer, take a shot behind the controls of the Raven. Stellar 7 is stellar".

Joe Blenkle from The Orangevale News stated that " It's no stroll in the park, however, as the action is intense and you will find yourself with white knuckles on the control pad before long"

Entertainment Weekly noted an impressive opening narration, music, and graphics, but found that the controls were hard to use when fighting aliens.

References 

1993 video games
3DO Interactive Multiplayer games
3DO Interactive Multiplayer-only games
Alien invasions in video games
First-person shooters
Tank simulation video games
Video games developed in the United States
Video game sequels
Dynamix games
Single-player video games